Verses of Love is an Indonesian drama film from MD Pictures, Producer Manoj Punjabi and Dhamoo Punjabi. It is a romantic religious drama based on the bestselling novel with the same title by Habiburrahman El Shirazy. While the story is set in Cairo, Egypt, the film was shot in India and Semarang, Indonesia. Ayat-Ayat Cinta was released on February 28, 2008 in Indonesia, May 8, 2008 in Singapore, and June 19, 2008 in Malaysia.

Upon release, it was one of the most successful Indonesian film, and was the first Indonesian film to reach 3.5 million tickets sold, only to be surpassed by Laskar Pelangi a few months later. Both films are the only film to surpass more than 3 million audiences before 2010s. In 2016 during the screening of Rudy Habibie, a sequel was confirmed to be in development; to be released in December 2017.

Synopsis 
The clever Fahri bin Abdillah goes on scholarship to Egypt to undertake study for a master's degree in Islam at Al-Azhar University, Cairo; his parents had to sell their rice field to help him as well.

Fahri has a plan for his life to be achieved through his perseverance and discipline. He plans to marry when his thesis is accepted. He has yet to have a close relationship with a woman beyond what he had with his mother and grandmother.

Maria Girgis is his first admirer: a Coptic Christian neighbor that, attracted to him for his knowledge of the Al Quran, admits it only in her diary.

The Indonesian student Nurul did not recognize her attraction to Fahri. Nurul, a daughter of a well-regarded Muslim cleric in Indonesia, made Fahri think himself unworthy.

The humble next door Egyptian neighbor, Noura, had empathy for Fahri since he got a scholarship but she romantically interpreted the feelings and this led to an accusation of rape.

Aisha's beautiful eyes captured Fahri's heart and in the metro when Fahri defended Islam from being narrow-minded, Aisha fell in love with him. Before marriage, Fahri sought to satisfy the desire in his heart and follow his religious faith in pursuit of this relationship.

Released 
Ayat-Ayat Cinta was schedule to be releasedon December 19, 2007, but it delayed to February 28, 2008, for some reason.

Comparison to novel 
In the novel: 
 Maria has a younger brother, Youssef; in the film she is an only child.
 Fahri is arrested and imprisoned on religious grounds by the respected scholars Professor Abdul Rauf, Ismail, Hamada, Haj Rashed and Marwan. In the film, Fahri is accused and imprisoned for being a cruel, yet wise culprit.
 The American reporter Alicia returns to Egypt to visit Fahri, a recent Muslim convert; in the film she never converts.

Soundtrack 

The film's title track Verses of Love was selected as the lead single from the album soundtrack to promote the film, and met with critical and commercial success. A music video was also made for the single.

 "Ayat-Ayat Cinta" (Rossa) — 3:48
 "Jalan Cinta" (Sherina) — 4:32
 "Takdir Cinta"  (Rossa) — 3:32
 "Tercipta Untukku" (featuring Rossa) (Ungu) — 4:25
 "Andai Ku Tahu" (Ungu) — 4:46
 "Opening Scene" (Music Scoring) — 2:41
 "Letter From Noura" (Music Scoring) — 1:18
 "Thalagi" (Music Scoring) — 1:13
 "The Basket"  (Music Scoring)  1:06
 "Ayat-Ayat Cinta" (Minus One) — 3:47
 "Jalan Cinta" (Minus One) — 4:32
 "Takdir Cinta"  (Minus One)  — 3:30

Sequel

During the screening of Rudy Habibie, a sequel for the film was confirmed. It is titled Ayat-Ayat Cinta 2, this time, it was directed by Guntur Soehardjanto, while Alim Sudio and Ifan Ismail writing the script. The film was released on December 21, 2017.

References

External links 
 Review in Warung Fiksi Portal
 

2008 films
2000s Indonesian-language films
Films based on Indonesian novels
Films shot in Indonesia
Films directed by Hanung Bramantyo
Indonesian drama films
2008 drama films
Films scored by Melly Goeslaw
Films scored by Anto Hoed
Films scored by Tya Subiakto